The Exonian is the bi-weekly student-run newspaper of Phillips Exeter Academy in Exeter, New Hampshire. It has been printed continuously since April 6, 1878, making it the oldest continuously-published preparatory school newspaper in the country.  It is published weekly by its student board and is subject to limited faculty censorship. Many parents and alumni hold subscriptions to the paper, which acts as a forum for the ideas of the Exeter community and prints extensive news, investigative, opinion, sports, and feature articles. In 2011, the newspaper became available to all students free of cost.

History

The paper was begun as a weekly in 1878, when three Exeter students, two of whom were roommates in Abbot Hall, decided to publish a newspaper for the academy. The first issue appeared on Saturday, April 6, of that year.

Operations
The Exonian has been published online since 2010.

The Exonian consists of three boards, an executive board, an upper board and a lower board.  These three boards exist for all three branches of The Exonian. The executive board of The Exonian is directed by the editor-in-chief and typically includes a managing editor, director of writing, chief digital editor and business board chair.

The editorial board's upper board is charged with producing all of the paper's content. The editorial board assigns and edits articles, designs the paper and manages visuals, including photography and graphics. The lower board, composed of staff writers, writes the content in the paper. Typically, staff writers are underclassmen, while the upper board is composed of upperclassmen.

The business board's upper board conducts all advertising, operations subscriptions, accounting and outreach. The business board's lower board, composed of associates, works within the aforementioned branches. Similarly to the editorial board, upperclassmen typically make up the upper board, whereas underclassmen typically make up the lower board.

The web board's upper board controls all aspects of The Exonians web presence. They are in charge of all long-term projects and the appearance of the website.

Mission 
As stated on The Exonians website, the paper's mission is as follows:The primary focus of The Exonian as a high-school newspaper is to provide meaningful content and independent reporting to the Exeter community by allowing students of Phillips Exeter Academy to work as practicing journalists. We strive to achieve or surpass the professional standards of journalistic integrity in all of our work.

Notable alumni

 Whitney Balliett (1944) – jazz critic
 Alex Beam (1971) – journalist
 Roscoe Conkling Bruce (1898) — educator
 David Folkenflik (1987) – journalist
 Laurie Hays (1975) – Pulitzer Prize-winning journalist
 Corliss Lamont (1920) — socialist philosopher
 Ned Lamont (1972) – businessman, 2006 Democratic nominee for Connecticut senator, Governor of Connecticut
 Dwight Macdonald (1924) – essayist and philosopher
 Joyce Maynard (1971) – writer
 Bradley Palmer (1884) – lawyer, helped found the United Fruit Company, Gillette, and ITT
 George Plimpton (1944) – journalist, writer, and actor
 Arthur Schlesinger Jr. (1933) – historian
 Donald Ogden Stewart (1912) – author and screenwriter, member of the Algonquin Round Table
 George W. S. Trow (1961) – author and essayist
 Gore Vidal (1943) – author
 Greg Daniels (1980) – TV producer and screenwriter

Honors and awards
 2002 Columbia Scholastic Press Association Gold Circle Award
 Advertising & Advertising Photography (1st place)
 Sports Page Design – Full Color (2nd place)
 Sports News (3rd place)
2005 Columbia Scholastic Press Association Gold Circle Award
Page One Design, Color (1st place) 
2007 National Scholastic Press Association Newspaper Pacemaker Awards
2018 Youth Journalism International Courage in Journalism Award

In popular culture
The newspaper The Grave at the fictional Gravesend Academy from A Prayer for Owen Meany is based on The Exonian.

See also
 The Lawrence

References

External links
 The Exonian Online

High school newspapers published in the United States
Phillips Exeter Academy
Student newspapers published in New Hampshire